Ravan Baku FK is an Azerbaijani football club, based in Baku, that plays in the Azerbaijan First Division.

History
The club was founded in 2009. In May 2011, team secured their promotion to Azerbaijan Premier League after clinching second place in Azerbaijan First Division.

In club's debut 2011–12 season, Ravan ended in 8th position in Azerbaijan Premier League, the club's highest ever league finish. Following season, the club repeated its record by finishing 8th once again. In 2013, Ravan's ownership faced heavy criticism from local media, football experts and fans, for hiring and firing managers quite so often. Ravan were officially relegated on 17 May 2014 after suffering a 3–2 defeat at home to Baku.

Domestic history

Stadium 
Bayil Stadium is a typical football stadium in Bayil district of Baku, Azerbaijan. The stadium was one of the venues during 2012 FIFA U-17 Women's World Cup.

Players

Azerbaijani teams are limited to nine players without Azerbaijani citizenship. The squad list includes only the principal nationality of each player; several non-European players on the squad have dual citizenship with an EU country.

Current squad
''

Managers

Records

References

External links
Official website 

Football clubs in Azerbaijan
Association football clubs established in 2009
2009 establishments in Azerbaijan
Football clubs in Baku
Defunct football clubs in Azerbaijan
Association football clubs disestablished in 2017
2017 disestablishments in Azerbaijan
Ravan Baku FC